Bellevue, United States Virgin Islands may refer to:
Bellevue, Saint Croix, United States Virgin Islands
Bellevue, Saint Thomas, United States Virgin Islands